Elisabeth Maier (née Vathje) (born March 17, 1994, in Calgary, Alberta) is a retired Canadian skeleton racer.  In 2008, she was encouraged to try sliding sports by her father, who had shared an airplane trip with members of the Canadian luge team, but as a 14-year-old, she was too young to train bobsleigh, so she tried out for skeleton instead. She used a Bromley sled. Vathje was named one of the three women to represent Canada in skeleton at the 2018 Winter Olympics in Pyeongchang after finishing third in the World Cup season standings for 2017–18.  She is married to Austrian bobsleigh driver Benjamin Maier. She retired in 2022 after being left off the Canadian team for the 2021–22 season.

Notable results 
Vathje's first international race was on the North American Cup in 2010, at Lake Placid, where she finished 8th. The following season, she finished 16th in her first Junior World Championships and continued to race on the North American circuit, taking her first international gold at Lake Placid in 2013. Vathje was promoted to the Intercontinental Cup during the 2013–14 season, and won a silver medal at her fourth Junior Worlds in Winterberg, Germany, earning her a promotion to the World Cup squad.

In the 2014–15 World Cup season, her first on the top level of international sliding, Vathje had five podium finishes including one gold medal, at Calgary, and three silvers, in Lake Placid, St. Moritz and Igls.  She subsequently took home gold at races in Whistler (2016) and Winterberg (2017), as well as several additional podium finishes.

Vathje finished the 2017–18 season with 1470 points, ranking third, her best season in the overall World Cup rankings.

References

External links
 

1994 births
Canadian female skeleton racers
Living people
Sportspeople from Calgary
Skeleton racers at the 2018 Winter Olympics
Olympic skeleton racers of Canada
20th-century Canadian women
21st-century Canadian women